Karl Morgan (born February 23, 1961) is an American football coach and former player. He is the former head football coach at Mississippi Valley State University (MVSU) from 2010 to 2013 and Coahoma Community College in Coahoma County, Mississippi from 2014 to 2015.

Playing career
Morgan is an alumnus of the University of California, Los Angeles (UCLA) where he played as a defensive lineman for the Bruins from 1979 to 1982, garnering All-Pac-10 Conference honors following his senior year. His professional playing career started in 1983 with the Saskatchewan Roughriders in the Canadian Football League (CFL) where he was on the CFL's All-Rookie team. The next year, he signed with the Tampa Bay Buccaneers of the National Football League (NFL) and played for them from 1984 to 1986. He also played for the Houston Oilers during the 1986 season. Morgan came out of retirement in 1992 to play for the Arena Football League's (AFL) Cincinnati Rockers.

Coaching career

High School career
Morgan began his coaching career as the head football coach at Central Catholic High School in Morgan City, Louisiana from 1989 to 1992.

College career
Morgan entered the college ranks as a defensive line coach at Nicholls State University from 1993 to 1994. Subsequently, Morgan held the same position at Southern University in 1995, Purdue University in 1996 and Arkansas State University from 1997 to 2000. Morgan was hired for his first coordinator position as defensive coordinator at Alcorn State University in 2001, Hampton University from 2002 to 2004 and the University of North Alabama from 2005 to 2009.

Morgan was head football coach at Mississippi Valley State University from 2010 to 2013, compiling a record of 8 wins and 35 losses. In 2014, he accepted the head coaching position at Coahoma Community College and remained head coach through 2015.

Head coaching record

College

References

External links
 

1961 births
Living people
Alcorn State Braves football coaches
American football defensive tackles
Arkansas State Red Wolves football coaches
Canadian football defensive linemen
Cincinnati Rockers players
Coahoma Tigers football coaches
Hampton Pirates football coaches
Houston Oilers players
Mississippi Valley State Delta Devils football coaches
Nicholls Colonels football coaches
North Alabama Lions football coaches
Purdue Boilermakers football coaches
Saskatchewan Roughriders players
Southern Jaguars football coaches
Tampa Bay Buccaneers players
UCLA Bruins football players
High school football coaches in Louisiana
Vandebilt Catholic High School alumni
People from Houma, Louisiana
Coaches of American football from Louisiana
Players of American football from Louisiana
African-American coaches of American football
African-American players of American football
African-American players of Canadian football
21st-century African-American sportspeople
20th-century African-American sportspeople